Miguel Nido (born March 8, 1963) is a former tennis player from Puerto Rico, who represented his native country at the 1992 Summer Olympics in Barcelona. Partnering Juan Rios, the pair was defeated in the first round by Italy's Diego Nargiso and Omar Camporese. The right-hander reached his highest singles ATP-ranking on April 23, 1990, when he became the number 120 of the world.

External links
 
 
 

1963 births
Living people
Puerto Rican male tennis players
Tennis players at the 1991 Pan American Games
Tennis players at the 1992 Summer Olympics
Olympic tennis players of Puerto Rico
People from Carolina, Puerto Rico
Clemson Tigers men's tennis players
Pan American Games gold medalists for Puerto Rico
Pan American Games medalists in tennis
Central American and Caribbean Games medalists in tennis
Central American and Caribbean Games gold medalists for Puerto Rico
Central American and Caribbean Games silver medalists for Puerto Rico
Central American and Caribbean Games bronze medalists for Puerto Rico
Tennis players at the 1987 Pan American Games
Tennis players at the 1983 Pan American Games
Medalists at the 1991 Pan American Games